Boundary changes affecting the English county of Hertfordshire. The county borders Buckinghamshire to the west, Bedfordshire and Cambridgeshire to the north, Essex to the east and Greater London to the south. Until 1965 it had a southern boundary with Middlesex.

Summary
Apart from a number of minor exchanges of land with surrounding counties, the alterations in Hertfordshire's boundaries involved the following:

The county had four exclaves that were integrated into their surrounding counties in 1844, and a set of six small enclaves of Bedfordshire was annexed. 
In the south, the boundary with Middlesex was somewhat complex, with Hertfordshire forming a long protrusion into it. In 1889 Hertfordshire gained some territory in this area and when Greater London was formed in 1965 the whole area, including Barnet and East Barnet, became part of the new county. Potters Bar in Middlesex was surrounded by Hertfordshire on three sides, and it was transferred to it in 1965, along with South Mimms. 
In the north, the town of Royston was partly in Cambridgeshire until 1896
In the north west there were various irregularities in the boundaries with Buckinghamshire and Bedfordshire which were adjusted in the years from 1883 to 1897. 
In the south west the growth of the towns of Chorleywood and Rickmansworth necessitated an adjustment of the boundary with Buckinghamshire in 1906.
More recently, the boundary with Greater London has been partially aligned to the M25 motorway.

List of changes

See also

Notes
 These areas were merged with other areas to form the urban district and civil parish of Royston 1 October 1897 (Local Government Board Order 36,608) 
 The area included the following places: Arkley, Barnet, East Barnet, Monken Hadley, New Barnet, Totteridge

References

History of Hertfordshire
Hertfordshire